Blueback is a 2022 Australian drama film directed by Robert Connolly, from a screenplay written by Connolly and Tim Winton, based on Winton's 1997 novel of the same name. The film centres on a young girl who befriends a wild blue groper while diving, and becomes a passionate activist for protecting the ecosystem of Australia's coral reefs from destruction. It stars Mia Wasikowska, Radha Mitchell, Ilsa Fogg, Liz Alexander, Ariel Donoghue, Clarence Ryan, Pedrea Jackson, Erik Thomson, Eddie Baroo and Eric Bana. 

The film premiered at the 2022 Toronto International Film Festival on 10 September 2022, and had its theatrical release in Australia on 1 January 2023.

Cast
 Mia Wasikowska as Abby Jackson
 Ilsa Fogg as teenage Abby
 Ariel Donoghue as young Abby
 Radha Mitchell as Dora Jackson
 Liz Alexander as older Dora
 Clarence Ryan as Briggs
 Pedrea Jackson as teenage Briggs
 Erik Thomson as Costello
 Eddie Baroo as Merv
 Eric Bana as "Mad" Macka
 Albert Mwangi as Gitundu
 Dalip Sondhi as Mr. Carlisle
 Nick Paranamos as Macka's son

Production
In February 2021, a film adaptation of Blueback by Tim Winton was announced to be moving forward, with Robert Connolly announced to be directing, after years of development. Mia Wasikowska, Eric Bana and Radha Mitchell were set to star in the film, with Bana reteaming with Connolly after the Australian success of The Dry. The film was packaged and pitched for distributors in the film market at the 71st Berlin International Film Festival.

The film officially began principal photography on 22 March 2021, in Western Australia.

Release
Blueback had its world premiere at the 2022 Toronto International Film Festival on 10 September 2022. It was theatrically released in Australia by Roadshow Films on 1 January 2023.

Its Australian premiere occurred on 21 November 2022 at the opening of the Somerville Film festival in collaboration with the 2023 Perth Festival.

Reception 
On the review aggregator website Rotten Tomatoes, the film has an approval rating of 69% based on 39 reviews, with an average rating of 6/10. The website's consensus reads, "While it may be narratively slight and somewhat preachy, Blueback is a beautifully filmed family drama with an ecologically conscious message." On Metacritic, it has a weighted average score of 59 out of 100 based on 10 critics, indicating "mixed or average reviews".

References

External links
 
2022 films
Australian drama films
2020s English-language films
Films directed by Robert Connolly
Films based on Australian novels